Hans-Joachim "Jochen" Abel (born 25 June 1952) is a German former professional footballer who played as a forward.

Biography
Born in Düsseldorf, Abel made 183 appearances in the German Bundesliga for Fortuna Düsseldorf, VfL Bochum and Schalke 04 and scored 70 goals. His 60 goals for Bochum also signify a record for the club. His record of 16 successfully converted penalty goals is a Bundesliga record. Until his retirement, Abel played in Liechtenstein for FC Vaduz.

After his retirement from football he worked in the music business in logistics and managed FC Balzers, a Liechtenstein team which plays in the Swiss amateur leagues.

Career statistics

References

External links 
 

1952 births
Living people
Footballers from Düsseldorf
German footballers
German expatriate footballers
FC Schalke 04 players
VfL Bochum players
FC Vaduz players
FC Balzers players
Fortuna Düsseldorf players
Association football forwards
German expatriate sportspeople in Liechtenstein
Bundesliga players
2. Bundesliga players
Expatriate footballers in Liechtenstein
SC Westfalia Herne players
Olympic footballers of West Germany
West German footballers
FC Balzers managers
FC Vaduz managers
German football managers